Christian Schlauri (born 30 March 1985) is a Swiss footballer who plays for FC Frauenfeld. He is a former youth international and was in the Swiss U-17 squad that won the 2002 U-17 European Championships.

Honours 
 UEFA U-17 European Champion: 2002

External links
 Christian Schlauri profile at football.ch

References

1985 births
Living people
Footballers from Basel
Swiss men's footballers
Association football defenders
Switzerland youth international footballers
FC Winterthur players
FC Concordia Basel players
FC Schaffhausen players
Servette FC players
FC Lugano players
FC Frauenfeld players
Swiss Super League players
Swiss Challenge League players
Swiss Promotion League players
2. Liga Interregional players